Rhabdomantis galatia, the branded large fox, is a butterfly in the family Hesperiidae. It is found in Sierra Leone, Guinea, Liberia, Ivory Coast, Ghana, Nigeria, Cameroon, the Republic of the Congo, the Central African Republic, the Democratic Republic of the Congo and western Uganda. The habitat consists of forests.

The larvae feed on Trachyphrynium braunianum.

References

Butterflies described in 1868
Erionotini
Butterflies of Africa
Taxa named by William Chapman Hewitson